Vitaliy Volodymyrovych Skysh (born 23 March 1971) is a former Ukrainian professional football player.

Club career
He played 2 games in the 1996–97 UEFA Champions League qualification for FC Alania Vladikavkaz against Rangers, where his side lost 1–3 in the first leg at Ibrox and 2–7 at the Spartak Stadium for a 3-10 aggregate. In his book he claimed Rangers were the best side he had ever played against in his entire career.

Honours
 Russian Premier League runner-up: 1996.

External links
 

1971 births
Sportspeople from Kropyvnytskyi
Living people
Soviet footballers
Ukrainian footballers
Association football midfielders
Ukrainian expatriate footballers
Expatriate footballers in Russia
Ukrainian Premier League players
Russian Premier League players
NK Veres Rivne players
FC Zirka Kropyvnytskyi players
FC Zirka-2 Kirovohrad players
FC Chornomorets Odesa players
SC Odesa players
FC Spartak Ivano-Frankivsk players
FC Spartak Vladikavkaz players
FC Metalist Kharkiv players
FC Metalist-2 Kharkiv players
FC Metalurh Zaporizhzhia players
FC Metalurh-2 Zaporizhzhia players
SSSOR Metalurh Zaporizhzhia players
FC Elektrometalurh-NZF Nikopol players